We Were Soldiers is a 2002 war film written and directed by Randall Wallace and starring Mel Gibson. Based on the book We Were Soldiers Once… and Young (1992) by Lieutenant General (Ret.) Hal Moore and reporter Joseph L. Galloway, it dramatizes the Battle of Ia Drang on November 14, 1965.

Plot
In 1954, the French Army's Group Mobile 100, on patrol during the First Indochina War, is ambushed by Viet Minh forces. Viet Minh commander Nguyen Huu An orders his soldiers to "kill all they send, and they will stop coming".

Eleven years later, the United States is fighting the Vietnam War. US Army Lieutenant Colonel Hal Moore is chosen to train and lead a battalion. After arriving in Vietnam, he learns that an American base has been attacked and is ordered to take his 400 men after the enemy and eliminate the North Vietnamese attackers; intelligence has no idea of the number of enemy troops. Moore leads a newly-created air cavalry unit into the Ia Drang Valley. After landing, the soldiers capture a North Vietnamese soldier and learn from him that the location they were sent to is actually the base camp for a veteran North Vietnamese army division of 4,000 men.

Upon arrival in the area with a platoon of soldiers, 2nd Lt. Henry Herrick spots an enemy scout and runs after him, ordering his reluctant soldiers to follow. The scout lures them into an ambush, which results in several men being killed, including Herrick and his subordinates. The surviving platoon members are surrounded and cut off from the rest of the battalion. Sgt. Savage assumes command, calls in the artillery, and uses the cover of night to keep the Vietnamese from overrunning their defensive position.

Meanwhile, with helicopters constantly dropping off units, Moore manages to secure weak points before the North Vietnamese can take advantage of them. Despite being trapped and desperately outnumbered, the main US force manages to hold off the North Vietnamese with artillery, mortars, and helicopter airlifts of supplies and reinforcements. Eventually, Nguyen Huu An, the commander of the North Vietnamese division, orders a large-scale attack on the American position.

Back in the United States, Julia Moore has become the leader of the American wives who live on the base. When the Army begins to use taxi drivers to deliver telegrams that notify the next of kin of the soldiers' deaths, Julia personally takes over that responsibility.

At the point of being overrun by the enemy, Moore orders 1st Lt. Charlie Hastings, his forward air controller, to call in "Broken Arrow", a call for all available combat aircraft to attack enemy positions, even those close to the US troops' position, because they are being overrun. The aircraft attack with bombs, napalm, and machine guns, killing many PAVN and Viet Cong troops, but a friendly fire incident also results in American deaths. The North Vietnamese attack is repelled, and the surviving soldiers of Herrick's cut-off platoon, including Savage, are rescued.

Moore's troops regroup and secure the area. Nguyen Huu An plans a final assault on the Americans and sends most of his troops to carry out the attack, but Moore and his men overrun them and approach the enemy command center. Before the base camp guards can open fire, Major Bruce "Snake" Crandall and other helicopter gunships attack and destroy the remnant of the enemy force. With no more troops to call on, Huu An quickly orders the headquarters evacuated.

Having achieved his objective, Moore returns to the helicopter landing zone to be picked up. Only after everyone (including the dead and wounded) is removed from the battlefield does he fly out of the valley. Sometime later, Nguyen Huu An and his men arrive on the battlefield to collect their dead. He claims that the Americans will "think this was their victory. So this will become an American war".

At the end of the film, it is revealed that the landing zone immediately reverted to North Vietnamese hands after the American troops were airlifted out. Hal Moore continued the battle in a different landing zone, and after nearly a year, he returned home safely to Julia and his family. His superiors congratulate him for killing over 1,800 North Vietnamese Army and Viet Cong soldiers. An older Moore visits the Vietnam War memorial and looks at the names of the soldiers who fell at Ia Drang.

Cast

Adaptation from source material
In the source book, We Were Soldiers Once… And Young, Hal Moore complains, "Every damn Hollywood movie got [the Vietnam war] wrong." The director, Randall Wallace, said that he was inspired by that comment and became "determined to get it right this time."

The film's final version got many of the facts of the book presented onto film but is not entirely a historically accurate portrayal of the battle or entirely faithful to the book. For instance, the film depicts a heroic charge under the command of Lt. Col. Hal Moore at the end of the battle that destroys the Vietnamese reserve, ending the battle in an American victory (a fact that the director noted in his commentary). In fact, there was no heroic final charge in the book, and the North Vietnamese forces were not destroyed, although the Moore did report 834 enemy bodies and 1215 estimated KIA (one third of the enemy force). The US forces were reduced by 72 out of 395, with 18% fatal casualties. The Vietnamese commander, Lt. Col. Nguyen Huu An, did not see the conclusion at LZ X-Ray as the end of combat, and the battle continued the next day with combat action at LZ Albany, where the 2/7th, with A Company 1/5th, found themselves in a fight for their lives against Lt. Col. Nguyen Huu An's reserve.

Despite the differences from the book and departures from historical accuracy, Moore stated in a documentary, included in the video versions, that the film was the first one "to get [the war] right."

Reception

Critical response
 

Roger Ebert, writing for the Chicago Sun-Times, gave We Were Soldiers 3.5 stars out of 4, and praised its truthful and realistic battle scenes and how it follows the characters: "Black Hawk Down was criticized because the characters seemed hard to tell apart. We Were Soldiers doesn't have that problem; in the Hollywood tradition it identifies a few key players, casts them with stars, and follows their stories." Lisa Schwarzbaum, from Entertainment Weekly, gave the film a B and noted its fair treatment of both sides: "The writer-director bestows honor – generously, apolitically – not only on the dead and still living American veterans who fought in Ia Drang, but also on their families, on their Vietnamese adversaries, and on the families of their adversaries too. Rarely has a foe been portrayed with such measured respect for a separate reality, which should come as a relief to critics (I'm one) of the enemy's facelessness in Black Hawk Down; vignettes of gallantry among Vietnamese soldiers and such humanizing visual details as a Vietnamese sweetheart's photograph left behind, in no way interfere with the primary, rousing saga of a fine American leader who kept his promise to his men to 'leave no one behind dead or alive.'"

David Sterritt, from the Christian Science Monitor, criticized the film for giving a more positive image of the Vietnam War that, in his opinion, did not concur with reality: "The films about Vietnam that most Americans remember are positively soaked in physical and emotional torment – from Platoon, with its grunt's-eye view of combat, to Apocalypse Now, with its exploration of war's dehumanizing insanity. Today, the pendulum has swung back again. If filmmakers with politically twisted knives once sliced away guts-and-glory clichés, their current equivalents hack away all meaningful concern with moral and political questions. We Were Soldiers is shameless in this regard, filling the screen with square-jawed officers who weep at carnage and fresh-faced GIs who use their last breaths to intone things like, 'I'm glad I died for my country.'"

Todd McCarthy, from Variety, wrote the film "presents the fighting realistically, violently and relatively coherently given the chaotic circumstances..." McCarthy further wrote, "Mel Gibson has the closest thing to a John Wayne part that anyone's played since the Duke himself rode into the sunset, and he plays it damn well." He summarized with, "Gibson's performance anchors the film with commanding star power to burn. This officer truly loves his men, and the credibility with which the actor is able to express Moore's leadership qualities as well as his sensitive side is genuinely impressive."

Involved combatant's response
Hal Moore, who had long been critical of many Vietnam War films for their negative portrayals of American servicemen, publicly expressed approval of the film and is featured in segments of the DVD.

Retired Colonel Rick Rescorla, who played an important role in the book (and was pictured on the book's cover), was disappointedafter reading the scriptto learn that he and his unit had been left out of the film. In one key incident, the finding of a vintage French bugle on a dying Vietnamese soldier, the English-born Rescorla is replaced by a nameless Welsh platoon leader.

Box office
We Were Soldiers grossed $78.1 million in the United States and Canada, and $37.3 million in other territories, for a worldwide total of $115.4 million, against a budget of $75 million.

Further reading

See also
 1st Cavalry Division

References

External links

 
 
 
 

2002 films
2000s action war films 
American action war films 
Battle of Ia Drang
Films scored by Nick Glennie-Smith
Films based on non-fiction books
Films directed by Randall Wallace
Films produced by Bruce Davey
Films set in 1954
Films set in the 1960s
Films set in 1965
Films set in the United States
Films shot in Georgia (U.S. state)
2000s French-language films
Paramount Pictures films
Icon Productions films
Vietnam War films
Vietnamese-language films
War films based on actual events
Films about the United States Army
Films set in Vietnam
Impact of the September 11 attacks on cinema
Film controversies in Vietnam
2000s English-language films
2000s American films